This is a list of submissions to the 70th Academy Awards for Best Foreign Language Film. The Academy Award for Best Foreign Language Film was created in 1956 by the Academy of Motion Picture Arts and Sciences to honour non-English-speaking films produced outside the United States. The award is handed out annually, and is accepted by the winning film's director, although it is considered an award for the submitting country as a whole. Countries are invited by the Academy to submit their best films for competition according to strict rules, with only one film being accepted from each country.

For the 70th Academy Awards, forty-four films were submitted in the category Academy Award for Best Foreign Language Film. The submission deadline was set on November 1, 1997. The highlighted titles were the five nominated films, which came from Brazil, Germany, Russia and Spain, and the eventual winner, Character, from the Netherlands. The Democratic Republic of the Congo, Luxembourg and Ukraine submitted a film for the first time. South Africa sent its first film since the end of apartheid.

Submissions

References

70